Eric Weisbard is an American music critic known for founding the Pop Conference, which is hosted annually by the Museum of Pop Culture (formerly known as the EMP Museum). He also organized the conference for many years.

Career 
Weisbard serves as an associate professor of American studies at the University of Alabama. He is also the author of both a 33⅓ book entry about Use Your Illusion and the 2014 book Top 40 Democracy: The Rival Mainstreams of American Music, and a former editor for Spin. With Craig Marks, he was also the co-editor of the Spin Alternative Record Guide, and has also written for the Village Voice. For Top 40 Democracy, he received the 2015 Woody Guthrie Award from the International Association for the Study of Popular Music's United States branch.

Personal life
Weisbard is married to Ann Powers, a music critic for NPR. They were married in 1998.

References

External links

Living people
American music critics
American book editors
University of Alabama faculty
American music journalists
The Village Voice people
Year of birth missing (living people)